The 2020 United States presidential election in Colorado was held on Tuesday, November 3, 2020, as part of the 2020 United States presidential election in which all 50 states plus the District of Columbia participated. Colorado voters chose electors to represent them in the Electoral College via a popular vote, pitting the Republican Party's nominee, incumbent President Donald Trump from Florida, and his running mate Vice President Mike Pence from Indiana, against Democratic Party nominee, former Vice President Joe Biden from Delaware, and his running mate, Senator Kamala Harris from California. Colorado had nine electoral votes in the Electoral College.

The Democratic National Committee (DNC) proposed Denver as a finalist to host the 2020 Democratic National Convention, but the city declined, citing conflicts. The Democrats had met in Denver in 1908 and 2008 Democratic National Convention. The DNC ultimately decided to hold the convention in Milwaukee, Wisconsin.

Prior to the election, all 14 news organizations considered Colorado a state Biden would win, or a likely blue state. On the day of the election, Biden won Colorado with over 55% of the vote, and by a victory margin of 13.50%, an 8.6 percentage point improvement on Clinton's victory in the state four years prior, the strongest Democratic performance since Lyndon B. Johnson in 1964, and the first time that it voted for a presidential candidate of either major party by a double-digit percentage since Ronald Reagan in 1984. In this election, Colorado weighed in as 9.1% more Democratic than the nation as a whole. The results established Colorado as a Democratic stronghold, rather than the Democratic-leaning battleground state it had been for the past three election cycles. With Biden's win, Colorado voted Democratic at the presidential level four times in a row for the first time since statehood, the state having previously voted for Barack Obama in 2008 and 2012 and for Hillary Clinton in 2016. Per exit polls by the Associated Press, changing demographics made Colorado more favorable to Democrats, with Latinos backing Biden with 68%, including Latinos of Mexican heritage with 75%. Biden also carried whites with 53%. 69% of voters favored increasing federal government spending on green and renewable energy, and they favored Biden by 76%–23%.

Biden flipped three counties in the Centennial State: Pueblo County, which had been reliably Democratic before narrowly backing Trump in 2016; Chaffee County, one of the few counties to flip from John McCain to Obama in 2012; and Garfield County, which had last voted Democratic when Bill Clinton won it in 1992. Biden also significantly closed the gap in the GOP's two largest remaining strongholds in the state, El Paso County and Douglas County, becoming the first Democrat to win more than 40% of the vote in the former since 1964 and closing the gap in the latter to single digits for the first time since 1964. Nevertheless, Biden became the first Democrat since Grover Cleveland in 1892 to win the White House without carrying Conejos County, as well as the first since Woodrow Wilson in 1912 to do so without carrying Huerfano or Las Animas Counties. Trump also narrowly flipped Alamosa County, one of only fifteen counties nationwide that voted for Hillary Clinton in 2016 and Trump in 2020, thereby making Biden the first Democrat to win the White House without carrying this county since Jimmy Carter in 1976.

This marked the first time since 1968 that Colorado voted more Democratic than neighboring New Mexico. The margin of victory for Biden in New Mexico was 10.79%, 2.71% lower than Colorado.

Primary elections
The primary elections were held on Super Tuesday, March 3, 2020.

Republican primary
The Republican primary was due to be canceled until Robert Ardini, a retired advertising executive, decided to submit his name for the ballot. Several others subsequently joined him.

Democratic primary

Libertarian nominee
Jo Jorgensen, Psychology Senior Lecturer at Clemson University

General election

Predictions

Polling

Graphical summary

Aggregate polls

Polls

Donald Trump vs. Michael Bloomberg

Donald Trump vs. Pete Buttigieg

with Donald Trump and Kamala Harris

Donald Trump vs. Amy Klobuchar

Donald Trump vs. Bernie Sanders

Donald Trump vs. Elizabeth Warren

Donald Trump vs. Generic Democrat

Results

Results by county

Results by congressional district
Biden won 4 out of the 7 congressional districts in Colorado.

Counties that flipped from Republican to Democratic
Chaffee (largest municipality: Salida)
Garfield (largest municipality: Glenwood Springs)
Pueblo (largest municipality: Pueblo)

Counties that flipped from Democratic to Republican
Alamosa (largest municipality: Alamosa)

Notes 

Partisan clients

See also
 United States presidential elections in Colorado
 2020 Colorado elections
 2020 United States presidential election
 2020 Democratic Party presidential primaries
 2020 Republican Party presidential primaries
 2020 United States elections

References

Further reading

External links
  (State affiliate of the U.S. League of Women Voters)
 

Colorado
2020
Presidential